Rincon Point, was a cape marking the southern extremity of Yerba Buena Cove in what is now San Francisco, California.  Rincón is Spanish for "corner", and the point formed the southern corner of the cove.

With the cove filled in and the Point landlocked, it is now the location where the Oakland Bay Bridge terminates in San Francisco.

References

Landforms of San Francisco